is Chinese-style Japanese dish consisting of chilled Chinese noodle with various toppings served in the summer. Toppings are usually colorful cold ingredients and a tare sauce.

Popular toppings are some meat (ham, boiled chicken or barbecued pork (char siu)), strips of tamagoyaki (egg omelette), summer vegetables like cucumber and tomatoes, menma (fermented bamboo shoots), and beni shōga (pickled ginger) as condiment. Toppings are cut thin, to mix well with the noodles and the sauce.  The tare sauce is usually made with a base of either soy sauce and rice vinegar, or sesame seeds and mayonnaise.

See also 
 Jungguk-naengmyeon
 List of ramen dishes

Notes

External links 

 The Spruce Eats article about Hiyashi chūka

Japanese cuisine
Ramen dishes
Cold noodles